Charles R. Longsworth (born August 21, 1929) is the current director of Saul Centers, Inc.. He assumed this position in June 1993. He serves as president Emeritus of Hampshire College. He worked as president of The Colonial Williamsburg Foundation from 1977 to 1994, as Chief Executive Officer until November 1992, and Chairman from November 1991 to November 1994. He works as Chairman Emeritus of The Colonial Williamsburg Foundation of Williamsburg, Virginia. He graduated from Amherst College in 1951 and serves as Life Trustee at the college. Mr. Longsworth was Hampshire College's founding vice president who succeeded Franklin Patterson as President (1971–1977), and who had helped draft the final 1965 plan in the form of The Making of College from the New College Plan. He is a member of the American Philosophical Society.

Footnotes

References

Presidents of Hampshire College
Amherst College alumni
Living people
1929 births
Members of the American Philosophical Society